Jean-Pierre Decool (born 19 October 1952 in Bourbourg, Nord) is a member of the National Assembly of France. He represents the Nord department,  and is a member of the Union for a Popular Movement.

In 2012, Decool said that the French army must breed more carrier pigeons, claiming that the Chinese army had decided to ramp up its own carrier pigeon training efforts. Decool said that carrier pigeons could play a key role in a crisis in which other communications systems started breaking down. His statements were widely reported in the media.

References

1952 births
Living people
People from Nord (French department)
Union for a Popular Movement politicians
The Popular Right
Deputies of the 12th National Assembly of the French Fifth Republic
Deputies of the 13th National Assembly of the French Fifth Republic
Deputies of the 14th National Assembly of the French Fifth Republic
Senators of Nord (French department)